"Inside Out" is a song by alternative rock band Vonray. It is their only charting single.

Track listing

Smallville single
 "Inside Out" - 3:40 (Radio Version)
 "Inside Out" - 3:30 (Smallville Unplugged Version)

Chart performance

2003 songs